Matías Martín Miramontes (born 27 December 1981) is an Argentine footballer who plays as a left winger for Atlético Acebal in Argentina.

Miramontes also holds European Union nationality.

Career
Miramontes started his playing career in 1999 with Temperley in the lower leagues of Argentine football. In 2003, he was signed by Italian Serie B side Venezia where he made 64 league appearances, scoring 4 goals. In 2005, he joined U.D. Leiria of Portugal, but soon returned to Argentina where he spent a season with Newell's Old Boys before joining Gimnasia de Jujuy in 2007.

In August 2008 he returned to Serie B for Ancona, signed a 2-year contract.

On 29 July 2010, he signed a 2-year contract with Cremonese. In January 2011 he was exchanged with Robson Toledo.

References

External links
 Argentine Primera statistics
 Football-Lineups player profile

1981 births
Living people
People from Banfield, Buenos Aires
Sportspeople from Buenos Aires Province
Argentine people of Italian descent
Argentine footballers
Association football wingers
Venezia F.C. players
U.D. Leiria players
Newell's Old Boys footballers
Gimnasia y Esgrima de Jujuy footballers
A.C. Ancona players
U.S. Cremonese players
U.S. Triestina Calcio 1918 players
Expatriate footballers in Italy
Expatriate footballers in Portugal
Argentine expatriate sportspeople in Italy
Argentine expatriate sportspeople in Portugal
Citizens of Italy through descent
Italian people of Argentine descent
Argentine expatriate footballers
Argentine Primera División players
Primeira Liga players
Serie B players